Anthony George Lyster (1852 – 17 March 1920) was born in Hollyhead, Wales. He was engineer-in-chief to the Mersey Docks and Harbour Board from 1897, when he succeeded his father, George Fosbery Lyster, until his retirement in 1913, when he was honoured with the presidency of the Institution of Civil Engineers.

Among his work is Brunswick Entrance Locks, opened 1905, Vittoria Dock, opened 1909, and Stanley Dock Tobacco Warehouse. The latter was the largest warehouse in the world when built, and extends along the whole of the south front of Stanley Dock. The last dock Lyster built was the Graving Dock at Gladstone Dock.

He married on 3 December 1892 Frances Laura Arabella, former wife of the explorer and author Harry de Windt, and sister of the 1st Viscount Long of Wraxall. There were no children from the union. Lyster died at 10 Gloucester Gate, Regent's Park, London, on 17 March 1920, and was buried at Braden Lane, near High Wycombe, Buckinghamshire. His estate was left in trust for a nephew, subject to the life interest of his widow.

References

External links
 Port Cities: – Anthony George Lyster, dock engineer (1852-1920) at www.mersey-gateway.org

British civil engineers
1852 births
1920 deaths
Presidents of the Institution of Civil Engineers
Harbour engineers
19th-century British engineers
20th-century British engineers
English civil engineers